Fencing at the 2002 Asian Games was held in Gangseo Gymnasium, Busan, South Korea from September 29 to October 4, 2002.

Schedule

Medalists

Men

Women

Medal table

Participating nations
A total of 154 athletes from 17 nations competed in fencing at the 2002 Asian Games:

References
2002 Asian Games Report, Pages 402–414

External links
 Official website

 
2002 Asian Games events
2002
Asian Games
2002 Asian Games